A Norwegian Official Report (NOU) is a report published by a panel or committee appointed by the Norwegian government. The Norwegian Parliament may request the government to establish such a committee.

External links
 List of NOU reports

Government of Norway
 
Politics of Norway